Boris Basil Bogoslovsky (29 April 1890, in Ryazan – 2 December 1966, in Charleston, Illinois) was a Russian-American teacher and United Nations official.

Bogoslovosky emigrated to the United States, where he became a naturalized citizen. He married a Swedish teacher, Christina Staël von Holstein, and the pair taught at the Cherry Lawn School, a progressive boarding school in Darien, Connecticut. In 1933 they became co-directors of the school. Bogoslovosky taught science there until 1945, when he joined the United Nations as a translator in the UN's Russian Language Section. He was also an observer for the US government at the Nuremberg Trials.

Works
 The technique of controversy: principles of dynamic logic, 1928. In the series The International Library of Psychology, Philosophy and Scientific Method.
 The ideal school, 1936.

References

1890 births
1966 deaths
Emigrants from the Russian Empire to the United States
20th-century American educators
American officials of the United Nations
Date of death missing
Place of death missing